An acid is any chemical compound that, when dissolved in water, gives a solution with a pH of less than 7.0.

Acid or ACID may also refer to:

Science
 Corrosive substance, commonly (though imprecisely) referred to as an acid
 Lysergic acid diethylamide (LSD), a semisynthetic, psychedelic drug commonly referred to as acid

Computing
 ACID (atomicity, consistency, isolation, durability), an initialism for the transactional properties of database management systems
 Acid1, a web browser test page
 Acid2
 Acid3
 Acid Pro, professional digital audio workstation software
 Acid (computer virus), a computer virus

Music
 "Acid-like", the sound produced by the Roland TB-303 electronic music synthesizer

Genres
 Psychedelic music, inspired by the use of psychedelic drugs including LSD
 Acid rock, originating in the mid-1960s
 Acid house, originating in the mid-1980s
 Acid jazz, originating in the mid-1980s
 Acid trance, originating in the early to mid-1990s
 Acid techno, originating in the early 1990s
 Neo-Psychedelia, originating in the early 1980s, and sometimes called acid punk
 Stoner rock, originating in the mid-1990s, and sometimes called acid metal
 Psychedelic funk, originating in the late-1960s, and sometimes called acid funk

Bands
 Acid (Belgian band), a Belgian heavy metal band
 Acid (band), a Japanese band
 Acid (hip hop group), a Burmese hip-hop group
 The Acid, an electronic music band

Songs
 "Acid", by Venom from the 1991 album Temples of Ice
 "Acid", by Red Harvest from the 1992 album Nomindsland
 "Acid", by Esham from the 1992 album Judgement Day Vol. 1: Day
 "Acid", by Toad the Wet Sprocket from the 1997 album MOM II: Music for Our Mother Ocean
 "Acid", by Emm Gryner from the 1998 album Public
 "Acid", by Gigi D'Agostino from the 1999 EP Tanzen
 "Acid", by G.G.F.H. from the 2001 album The Very Beast of G.G.F.H. Vol. 1
 "Acid", by Lil Wyte from the 2003 album Doubt Me Now
 "Acid", by Ghost Town from the 2014 album The After Party
 "Acid", by Blancmange from the 2015 album Semi Detached
 "Acid", by Power Trip from the 2018 album Opening Fire: 2008–2014
 "Acid", by Jockstrap from the 2020 EP Wicked City
 "Acidic", by Slipknot from the 2022 album The End, So Far

Other uses
 A common street name for LSD
 Acid (film), a 2018 Russian drama film
 Acid (novel), a 2016 novel by Sangeetha Sreenivasan
 ACiD Productions, an underground digital art group also known as ANSI Creators in Demand
 "Acid", a track on Richard Pryor's 1976 comedy album Bicentennial Nigger
 Acid Betty, Jewish-American drag queen

See also
 Acid test (disambiguation)